= List of spelling-to-sound correspondences in Catalan =

These are lists of spelling-to-sound correspondences in the Catalan language. The two main standard forms (Standard Catalan and Standard Valencian) are used as primary transcriptions norms of their respective spelling forms.

== Spelling patterns and pronunciation in Catalan and Valencian ==
Consonants and combinations of consonant letters
Spelling		Main values (IPA)		Examples	Other values (IPA)		Examples
Spelling		Cat. (IEC)	Va. (AVL)	Examples	Cat. (IEC)	Va. (AVL)	Examples
b	initially and medially (elsewhere)	/b/		blau, roba	/p/		Baotou
b	medially before a lateral	/bː/	/b/	poble	—		—
b	medially before a nasal	/mː/	/b/	submarins	—		—
b	medially before a nasal	/nː/	/b/	obnoxi	—		—
b	medially before a voiceless cons.	/p/		absolut	—		—
b	finally	/p/		cub	Ø	Ø	amb
b	finally	/p/		cub	Ø	/p/	tomb
bb		/bː/		abbàssida	/b/		lobby
bh		/b/		subhasta	—		—
bs		/ps/ (Note: (or simply /s/))		abstracte	—		—
bv		/bː/	/bv/	obvietat	—		—
ç	final before vowels or a voiced cons.	/z/		feliçment	—		—
ç	elsewhere	/s/		açò	—		—
c	before e, i	/s/		ciri	/t͡ʃ/		Versace
c	initially and medially (elsewhere)	/k/		casa	/t͡s/		Cao Zhi
c	finally	/k/		rec	Ø	/k/	banc
c	medially before a voiced cons.	/ɡ/		ècdisi	—		—
c	medially before a nasal	/ŋ/		tècnics	—		—
cc	before e, i	/ks/		acció	/t͡ʃ/		Gucci
*ch (old form and loanwords)		/k/		Lluch	/t͡ʃ/		Alborch
*ch (old form and loanwords)		/k/		Lluch	/ʃ/		quiche
*ch (old form and loanwords)		/k/		Lluch	/x/		Bach (Ge. surname)
cch (in loanwords)		/k/		Crecchio	—		—
cht (in loanwords)		/t/		yacht	—		—
ck (in loanwords)		/k/		hacker	—		—
cks (in loanwords)		/ks/		snacks	—		—
cs		/ks/		dacsa	—		—
ct	initially	/t/		ctònic	—		—
ct	medially	/kt/		acte	—		—
cz	before e, i	/gz/ (Note: (or /ks/, in Valencian))		èczema	—		—
d	initially and medially	/d/		dolç, cada	/t/		Dalian
d	finally	/t/		sord	Ø	/t/	rotund
dd		/dː/		adduir	—		—
dg	before e, i	/dʒ/	/dd͡ʒ/	pidgin	/t͡ʃ/		bridge
dg	elsewhere	/dɡ/ (Note: (or /ɡ/, after a nasal: /ŋɡ/))		Edgar	—		—
dh		/d/		adhesiu	—		—
dj		/d͡ʒ/		Django	—		—
dj		/dʒ/	/dd͡ʒ/	adjunt	—		—
dm		/dm/		cadmi	—		—
dn		/dn/		adnat	—		—
ds		/ts/		adscriure	—		—
dv		/db/	/dv/	ludvígia	—		—
f	medially before a voiced cons.	/v/		hafni	—		—
f	elsewhere	/f/		fars	—		—
ff (in loanwords)		/fː/		affidavit	/f/		office
fh		/f/		sulfhídric	—		—
g	before e, i	/ʒ/	/d͡ʒ/	gens	/ʃ/		collage
g	before e, i	/ʒ/	/d͡ʒ/	gens	/ɡ/		bagel
g	initially and medially (elsewhere)	/ɡ/		gana, àgab	/k/		Gansu
g	medially before a lateral	/ɡː/	/ɡ/	regla	—		—
g	medially and finally after i (see ig)	/t͡ʃ/		mig	/ɡ/		amígdala
g	medially and finally after i (see ig)	/d͡ʒ/		migdia	/ɡ/		amígdala
g	finally	/k/		reg	Ø	/k/	sang
gg	before e, i	/ʒː/	/d͡ʒ/	suggerir	—		—
gg	elsewhere	/ɡː/ (Note: (or simply /ɡ/, in Valencian))		burggravi	/ɡ/		ziggurat
gh (in loanwords)		/ɡ/		oghuz	—		—
ght (in loanwords)		/t/		light	—		—
gm		/ŋm/		estigma	—		—
gn	initially	/n/		gnom	—		—
gn	medially	/ŋn/		cigne	/ɲ/		cognac
gs		/ks/		regs	—		—
gs		/t͡ʃ/ (Note: (it varies with /-d͡ʒus/ and /-d͡ʒos/ (mitjos)))		migs	—		—
h		Ø		hivern	/h/		hàmster
j		/ʒ/	/d͡ʒ/	jocs	/ʒ/	/j/	ja
j		/ʒ/	/d͡ʒ/	jocs	/j/		Jotti
j		/ʒ/	/d͡ʒ/	jocs	/x/		jota (d.)
j		/ʒ/	/d͡ʒ/	jocs	/ʃ/	/t͡ʃ/	Rijkov
k (in loanwords)		/k/		kiwi	Ø		knock-out
kh (in loanwords)		/x/		abkhaz	/k/		kha
ks (in loanwords)		/ks/		quarks	—		—
l		/l/		laca	/l/	Ø	altre
ł (in loanwords)		/w/		Wojtyła	—		—
ll		/ʎ/		llac, cella, ell	/ʎ/	/l/	estrel(l)a
ll		/ʎ/		llac, cella, ell	/l/	/l/	ballet
ll		/ʎ/		llac, cella, ell	/lː/		allegro
ŀl		/lː/		ceŀla	—		—
lh		/l/		alhora	/lh/		coolhunter
lh		/l/		alhora	/ʎ/		Vielha
lj		/ʎʒ/	/ʎd͡ʒ/	aljub	/ʎ/		Ljubljana
m	initially and finally	/m/		mut, em	—		—
m	before f or v	/ɱ/		nimfa, tramvia (Va.)	—		—
mm		/mː/		immens	—		—
mn	initially	/n/		mnemòtic	—		—
mn	medially	/mn/		somni	—		—
Mc (in loanwords)		/mək/	/mak/	McCain	—		—
mh		/m/		amhàric	—		—
n	initially and finally	/n/		nou, ens	—		—
n	before f or v	/ɱ/		ínfim, canvi (Va.)	—		—
n	before a labial cons.	/m/		benparlat	—		—
n	before a palatal cons.	/ɲ/		menja, àngel	—		—
n	before a velar cons.	/ŋ/		vincle, fang	—		—
nn		/nː/		innat	/n/		sonne
ng (in loanwords)		/ŋ/		víking	—		—
nh		/n/		anhel	/nh/		skinhead
nh		/n/		anhel	/ɲ/		caipirinha
nj		/ɲʒ/	/ɲd͡ʒ/	penjar	/ɲ/		oranje
nm		/mː/		enmig	—		—
ny		/ɲ/		any	—		—
ñ (in loanwords)		/ɲ/		El Niño	—		—
p	initially and finally	/p/		pont, cup	Ø	/p/	camp
p	before a voiced cons.	/b/		capgròs	—		—
p	before a nasal	/mː/	/b/	capmàs	—		—
pp		/pː/		proppassat	/p/		hippy
ph (in compounds and classical terms)		/p/		caphuitada (Va.)	/f/		pholis
pn	initially	/n/		pneuma	—		—
pn	medially	/bn/		apnea	—		—
ps	initially	/s/		psicòleg	—		—
ps	medially	/ps/		capsa	—		—
pt	initially	/t/		ptilosi	—		—
pt	medially	/pt/		apte	/t/		comptar
q (see qu)		/k/		Qatar	/t͡ʃ/		Qinghai
r	initially	/r/		ratolí	—		—
r	medially after l, n, s	/r/		folro	—		—
r	medially (elsewhere)	/ɾ/		però	/r/		infraroig
r	medially (elsewhere)	/ɾ/		però	Ø		prendre
r	finally	/ɾ/		mar	Ø	Ø	dimarts
r	finally	/ɾ/		mar	Ø	/ɾ/	córrer
rr		/r/		marró	—		—
rh	initially	/r/		rhodesià	—		—
rh	medially	/ɾ/		superhome	/ɾh/		dírham
s	initially	/s/		sac	/z/		Saarland (Ge.)
s	medially next to a cons.	/s/		estimar	/z/		esma
s	after a nasal	/s/		institut	/z/		trànsit
s	most cases between two vowels	/z/		rosa	/s/		contrasenya
s	finally	/s/		dins, repòs	/ʃ/		ells
ss		/s/		rossa	—		—
sc	before e, i	/s/		ascens	/ʃ/		crescendo
sc	elsewhere	/sk/		escriure	/ʃk/		visca
-scs		/sks/ (Note: (it varies with /-skus/ and /-skos/ (boscos)))		boscs	—		—
sch (in loanwords)		/sk/ (Note: (or /esk/ in loanwords with initial s+consonant))		scherzo	—		—
sch (in loanwords)		/ʃ/		jiddisch	—		—
sh (in compounds and loanwords)		/z/		deshora	/ʃ/		sushi
sh (in compounds and loanwords)		/z/		deshora	/ʒ/		flashback
-st		/st/		est	/t/	/st/	aquest
-sts		/sts/ (Note: (it varies with /-stus/ and /-stos/ (gustos, aquestos)))		gusts	/ts/	/sts/	aquests
sx		/(s)ʃ/	/st͡ʃ/	desxifrat	—		—
sz (in loanwords)		/s/		Szolnok	—		—
sz (in loanwords)		/ʃ/		Tomasz	—		—
szcz (in loanwords)		/t͡ʃ/		Szczecin	—		—
t	initially and medially	/t/		tamís	—		—
t	finally	/t/		sort	Ø	/t/	font
tt		/tː/		posttònic	/t/		dittografia
tb (in loanwords)		/db/		futbol	—		—
tg	before e, i	/d͡ʒ/		fetge	—		—
th (in compounds and loanwords)		/t/		tothom	/θ/		theta
th (in compounds and loanwords)		/t/		tothom	/ð/		The Times
th (in compounds and loanwords)		/t/		tothom	/th/		apartheid
ti		/ti/		ties	/ʃ/		National Mall (En.)
tj		/d͡ʒ/		mitjà	—		—
tl		—	/lː/	vetl(l)a	/dl/		atles
tll		/ʎː/	—	vetl(l)a	/ʎː/	/ʎ/	bitllet
tm	initially	/m/		tmesi	—		—
tm	medially	/mː/ (Note: (or simply /m/, in Valencian))		sotmetre	/dm/		ritme
tn		/nː/		cotna	/dn/		ètnic
tch (in loanwords)		/t͡ʃ/		sketch	—		—
tsch (in loanwords)		/t͡ʃ/		kitsch	—		—
ts	initially	/t͡s/ (Note: (or initially /s/))		tsar	—		—
ts	medially and finally	/t͡s/		potser, bits	—		—
tx		/t͡ʃ/		cotxe	—		—
tz		/d͡z/		dotze	/d͡z/	/z/	utilitzar
tz		/t͡s/		hertz	—		—
tzsch (in loanwords)		/t͡ʃ/		nitzscheà	—		—
v	initially and medially	/b/	/v/	vila	/f/		von (Ge.)
v	finally	/p/	/f/	salv	/f/		Kíev
w (in loanwords)		/w/		western	/b/	/v/	watt
w (in loanwords)		/w/		western	/f/		Bukowski
wh (in loanwords)		/w/		whisky	/h/		The Who
x	initially	/ʃ/	/t͡ʃ/	xiular	/ʃ/		Xàtiva
x	next to a voiceless cons.	/ks/		expert	—		—
x	medially (elsewhere)	/ɡz/		examen	/ks/		fixar
x	medially and finally after i (see ix)	/ʃ/		guix	/ks/		mix
x	medially and finally after i (see ix)	/ʒ/		guix verd	—		—
x	finally	/ks/		índex	—		—
xc	before e, i	/ks/		excel·lent	—		—
xc	elsewhere	/(k)sk/		excavar	—		—
xh		/gz/		exhaust	—		—
xs		/ks/		exsudar	—		—
-xt		/(k)st/		mixt	—		—
-xts		/(k)sts/ (Note: (it varies with /-(k)stus/ and /-(k)stos/ (textos)))		texts	—		—
y (in loanwords, except the digraph ny)		/j/		yuppie	—		—
y (in loanwords, except the digraph ny)		/i/		husky	/ai̯/		bypass
yy (in loanwords)		/j/		Hudaybiyya	—		—
z	most cases	/z/		zona	/d͡z/		scherzo
z	most cases	/z/		zona	/t͡s/		Zemin
z	finally	/s/		brunz	/θ/		López
zz (in loanwords)		/d͡z/		mezzo	/z/		jacuzzi
zz (in loanwords)		/t͡s/		pizza	/s/		jazz
zh (in loanwords)		/z/		alzhèimer	/d͡ʒ/		Zhou
Vowels and combinations of vowel letters
Spelling		Main values (IPA)		Examples	Other values (IPA)		Examples
Spelling		Cat. (IEC)	Va. (AVL)	Examples	Cat. (IEC)	Va. (AVL)	Examples
a, à, â	stressed position	/a/	/a/	arc, àtom, pâ (Va.)	/ei̯/	/ei̯/	lady
a, à, â	stressed position	/a/	/a/	arc, àtom, pâ (Va.)	/ɔ/		yacht
a, à, â	unstressed position	/ə/	/a/	anís, mitja	/a/		allegretto
a, à, â	unstressed position	/ə/	/a/	anís, mitja	/ə/	/ɛ ~ ɔ/	terra, dona
a, à, â	unstressed position	/ə/	/a/	anís, mitja	/ə/	/e/	artista (m.)
a, à, â	unstressed position	/ə/	/a/	anís, mitja	Ø		mitja hora
a, à, â	unstressed position	/ə/	/a/	anís, mitja	/o/		Quartet (En.)
a, à, â	unstressed position (in contact with rhotics)	Ø	/a/	barana	/e/		software
a, à, â	unstressed position (in contact with rhotics)	Ø	/a/	barana	/eə/	/ea/	Square
ä (in loanwords)		/ɛ/		Händel	—		—
aa	stressed position	/əˈa/	/aˈa/	Isaac	—		—
aa	unstressed position	/əː/	/aː/	aalenià	—		—
ae	stressed position (open)	/əˈɛ/	/aˈɛ/	aeri	—		—
ae	stressed position (closed)	/əˈe/	/aˈe/	graella	—		—
ae	unstressed position	/əe/	/ae/	aeròbic	/i/		reggae
ae	unstressed position	/əe/	/ae/	aeròbic	/ə/	/e/	Michael
ae	unstressed position	/əe/	/ae/	aeròbic	/ai̯/		taekwondo
aé		/əˈe/	/aˈe/	tacaé	—		—
ai	stressed position	/ai̯/	/ai̯/	aigua	/e/		affaire
ai	stressed position	/ai̯/	/ai̯/	aigua	/ei̯/		container
ai	unstressed position	/əi̯/	/ai̯/	airós	—		—
aï	stressed position	/əˈi/	/aˈi/	raïm	—		—
aï	unstressed position	/ə.i/	/a.i/	aïllat	—		—
aí		/əˈi/	/aˈi/	país	—		—
ao		/au/	/ao/	caos	—		—
ao		/əˈo/	/aˈo/	graons	—		—
aó		/əˈo/	/aˈo/	raó	—		—
au	stressed position	/au̯/	/au̯/	caus	/o/		Foucault
au	unstressed position	/əu̯/	/au̯/	haurà	/o/		Faubourg
aü	stressed position	/əˈu/	/aˈu/	taüt	/ɔi̯/		fräulein
aü	unstressed position	/ə.u/	/a.u/	aüllar	—		—
aú		/əˈu/	/aˈu/	Esaú	—		—
e, é, è	stressed position (open/closed)	/ɛ/		dens, èxit	/ɛ/	/e/	alè/alé, què
e, é, è	stressed position (closed/open)	/e/		ella, bé	/ɛ/	/e/	alè/alé, què
e, é, è	stressed position (closed)	—		—	/i/		reggae
e, é, è	unstressed position	/ə/	/e/	en, rere	/e/		ídem
e, é, è	unstressed position	/ə/	/e/	en, rere	/ə/	/a/	espill
e, é, è	unstressed position	/ə/	/e/	en, rere	/ə/	/i/	naixement
e, é, è	unstressed position	/ə/	/e/	en, rere	/i/		reality
e, é, è	unstressed position	/ə/	/e/	en, rere	Ø		fanzines
e, é, è	unstressed position	/ə/	/e/	en, rere	Ø		no el té
e, é, è	unstressed position (in contact with rhotics)	Ø	/e/	veritat	—		—
ea	stressed position	/eˈa/		crear	/i/		beat
ea	stressed position	/eˈa/		crear	/ɛ/		spread
ea	stressed position	/e(i̯)ə/	/ea/	idea	/ɔ/		Sean
ea	unstressed position	/eə/	/ea/	àrea	/ə/	/e/	bearnesa
eà		/eˈa/		oceà	—		—
eau (in loanwords)		/o/		Rousseau	—		—
ee	stressed position	/əˈɛ/	/eˈe/	creença	/i/		jeep
ee	stressed position	/e(i̯)ə/	/eː/	idees	—		—
ee	unstressed position	/eə/	/eː/	àrees	—		—
ee	unstressed position	/əː/	/eː/	reeixir	—		—
ei	stressed position (open/closed)	/ɛi̯/		oleic	/ɛi̯/	/ei̯/	remei
ei	stressed position (closed/open)	/ei̯/	/ei̯/	reina	/ɛi̯/	/ei̯/	remei
ei	unstressed position	/əi̯/	/ei̯/	eivissenc	—		—
ei	stressed position (in loanwords)	/ai̯/		eingang	—		—
eï	stressed position	/əˈi/	/eˈi/	obeït	—		—
eï	unstressed position	/ə.i/	/e.i/	veïnat	—		—
èi		/ɛi̯/		plèiade	—		—
eo	stressed position (open)	/əˈɔ/	/eˈɔ/	beoci	—		—
eo	stressed position (closed)	/əˈo/	/eˈo/	eons	—		—
eo	unstressed position	/əu/	/eo/	teoria	/eo/		vídeo
eò		/əˈɔ/	/eˈɔ/	eòlic	—		—
eu	stressed position (open)	/ɛu̯/		peu	/ɔi̯/		Bayreuth
eu	stressed position (closed)	/eu̯/	/eu̯/	seu	/e/ (Note: (it corresponds to French /œ/))		amateur
eu	unstressed position	/əu̯/	/eu̯/	europea	—		—
eü		/əˈu/	/eˈu/	peüc	—		—
i, í, ï	stressed position	/i/		illa, ací	/ai̯/		copyright
i, í, ï	stressed position	/i/		illa, ací	/ɛ/ (Note: (it corresponds to French /ɛ̃/)) (Note: (it corresponds to English /ɜː/))		Rodin, birdie
i, í, ï	unstressed position	/i/		illa, ací	Ø		business
i, í, ï	after vowels (hiatus)	/ˈi/		naïf	—		—
i, í, ï	after vowels (unstressed position)	/i̯/		creies	—		—
ia	stressed position	/i̯a/	/i̯a/	iaio	—		—
ia	unstressed position	/i̯ə/	/i̯a/	veia	—		—
ie	stressed position	/i̯e/	/i̯e/	veient (Cat.)	/i/		briefing
ie	unstressed position	/i̯ə/	/i̯e/	feien	—		—
ii		/iː/		xiisme	—		—
iï		/iˈi/		xiïta	—		—
io	stressed position (open)	/i̯ɔ/		iode	—		—
io	stressed position (closed)	/i̯o/	/i̯o/	io-io	—		—
io	unstressed position	/i̯u/	/i̯o/	iogurt	—		—
iu		/i̯u/		iuguslau	—		—
o, ó, ò	stressed position (open)	/ɔ/		bo, allò	—		—
o, ó, ò	stressed position (closed)	/o/	/o/	mot, ós	/ou̯/		pincode
o, ó, ò	stressed position (closed)	/o/	/o/	mot, ós	/u/		Guangdong
o, ó, ò	unstressed position	/u/	/o/	ferro	/o/		ego
o, ó, ò	unstressed position	/u/	/o/	ferro	/u/		cobert
o, ó, ò	unstressed position	/u/	/o/	ferro	/u̯/		posa-ho
o, ó, ò	unstressed position	/u/	/o/	ferro	/ə/	/a/	Ogariov
oa	stressed position	/uˈa/	/oˈa/	poal	/uˈa/		Joan
oa	stressed position	/uˈa/	/oˈa/	poal	/ou̯/		coach
oa	stressed position	/oə/	/oa/	quinoa	/o/		snowboard
oa	unstressed position	/uə/	/oa/	lloador	/uə/	/ua/	Joaquim
oe	stressed position (open/closed)	/uˈɛ/	/oˈe/	coet	—		—
oe	stressed position (closed)	/uˈe/	/oˈe/	poeta	—		—
oe	unstressed position	/uə/	/oe/	àloe	—		—
oi (see ix)	stressed position (open)	/ɔi̯/		boira	/u̯a/		foie
oi (see ix)	stressed position (closed)	—	/oi̯/	coix	—		—
oi (see ix)	unstressed position	/ui̯/	/oi̯/	joiós	/uə/	/ua/	croissant
oï		/uˈi/	/oˈi/	roïns	—		—
oo		/oː/		zoo	/u/		zoom
oo		/uˈo/	/oˈo/	microones	—		—
ou	stressed position (open)	/ɔu̯/		bou	/au̯/		cloud
ou	stressed position (open)	/ɔu̯/		bou	/ɔ/		final four
ou	stressed position (closed)	/ou̯/	/ou̯/	sou (v.)	/u/		tour
ou	stressed position (closed)	/ou̯/	/ou̯/	sou (v.)	/w/		ouija
ou	unstressed position	/ɵu̯/	/ou̯/	clourà	—		—
u, ú, ü	stressed position	/u/		tu, ús	/i/		business
u, ú, ü	stressed position	/u/		tu, ús	/y/ (Note: (usually replaced with /i/ or /u/))		déjà vu, Müller
u, ú, ü	stressed position	/u/		tu, ús	/a/		punk
u, ú, ü	stressed position	/u/		tu, ús	/iu̯/		duty-free
u, ú, ü	stressed position	/u/		tu, ús	/ɛ/		return
u, ú, ü	after vowels (hiatus)	/ˈu/		reüll	—		—
u, ú, ü	after vowels (unstressed position)	/u̯/		creua	—		—
ua	stressed position	/uˈa/		suat	—		—
ua	unstressed position	/uə/	/ua/	cua	—		—
ue	stressed position (open)	/uˈɛ/	/uˈɛ/	duel	/u/		blues
ue	stressed position (open)	/uˈɛ/	/uˈɛ/	duel	/y/		fondue
ue	stressed position (open/closed)	/uˈɛ/	/uˈe/	fuet	—		—
ue	unstressed position	/uə/	/ue/	duen	—		—
ui		/ui̯/	/ui̯/ (in. /u̯i/)	buit	/u̯ei̯/		Anhui
uï		/uˈi/		fluït	—		—
uo	stressed position (open)	/uˈɔ/		cuot	—		—
uo	stressed position (closed)	/uˈo/		suor	—		—
uo	unstressed position	/uː/	—	suo	/uo/		duo
uu		/uː/	/uː/	lluu	—		—
Combinations of vowel and consonant letters
Spelling		Main values (IPA)		Examples	Other values (IPA)		Examples
Spelling		Cat. (IEC)	Va. (AVL)	Examples	Cat. (IEC)	Va. (AVL	Examples
aha		/əː/	/aː/	bahamià	/əha/	/aha/	Kalahari
ahà		/əˈa/	/aˈa/	sahàric	—		—
ahe		/əe/	/ae/	sahelians	—		—
ahe		/əˈe/	/aˈe/	subtrahend	—		—
ahi		/əi/	/ai/	Tahití	—		—
ahi		/əˈi/	/aˈi/	ahir	—		—
ahí		/əˈi/	/aˈi/	tahírida	—		—
aho		/əˈo/	/aˈo/	Mahoma	/aho/		navaho
aho		/əu/	/ao/	mahometà	—		—
ahò		/əˈɔ/	/aˈɔ/	mahònia	—		—
ahu		/əu/	/au/	infrahumans	—		—
aw (in loanwords)		/ɔ/		Law	—		—
ay (old form and loanwords)		/ai̯/		faraday	/ɛ/	/e/	Quai d'Orsay
ay (old form and loanwords)		/ei̯/		play	—		—
ci (in loanwords)		/t͡ʃ/		ciao	—		—
cci (in loanwords)		/t͡ʃ/		carpaccio	—		—
cqu (in loanwords)		/k/		jacquard	—		—
dqu	before e, i	/tk/		adquirir	—		—
eha		/eə/	/ea/	rehabilitar	—		—
ehe		/əˈɛ/	/eˈe/	aprehendre	—		—
ehe		/əː/	/eː/	vehement	—		—
ehi		/əˈi/	/eˈi/	vehicle	—		—
ehi		/əi/	/ei/	dehiscent	—		—
ehí		/əˈi/	/eˈi/	aldehídic	—		—
eho		/əu/	/eo/	prehomínids	—		—
ehu		/əu/	/eu/	sobrehumà	—		—
ew (in loanwords)		/iu̯/		newton	/u/		crew
ey (old form and loanwords)		/ei̯/		keynesià	/i/		bogey
gi (in loanwords)		/d͡ʒ/		adagio	—		—
ggi (in loanwords)		/d͡ʒ/		appoggiatura	—		—
gu	before a, o	/ɡw/		guant	—		—
gu	before a cons.	/ɡu/		agut	—		—
gu	before e, i	/ɡ/		guitza	—		—
gü	before e, i	/ɡw/		pingüí	—		—
iha		/iə/	/ia/	polihalita	/iha/		jihad
ihe		/iˈɛ/		periheli	—		—
ihe		/iə/	/ie/	antiheroi	—		—
ihè		/iɛ/		dihèlia	—		—
ihi		/iː/		anihilar	—		—
ihí		/iˈi/		polihídric	—		—
iho		/iu/	/io/	antihorari	—		—
ihu		/iu/	/iu/	antihumitat	/iu̯/		marihuana
ig	finally	/t͡ʃ/		reig	—		—
ig	finally	/it͡ʃ/		mig	—		—
ig	before a vowel or voiced cons.	/d͡ʒ/		reig blanc	—		—
ig	before a vowel or voiced cons.	/id͡ʒ/		migdia	—		—
igs		/t͡ʃ/ (Note: (it varies with /-(d͡)ʒus/ (lletjos with /d͡ʒ/, but rejos with /ʒ/) and /-d͡ʒos/ (both lletjos and rejos with /d͡ʒ/)))		reigs	—		—
igs		/it͡ʃ/		migs	—		—
ix	finally	/ʃ/	/i̯ʃ/	coix	—		—
ix	finally	/iʃ/		guix	—		—
ix	before a vowel or voiced cons.	/ʒ/	/i̯ʒ/	coix i cec	—		—
ix	before a vowel or voiced cons.	/iʒ/		guix verd	—		—
ïx	finally	/iʃ/		reïx	—		—
ïx	before a vowel or voiced cons.	/iʒ/		reïx bé	—		—
le (in loanwords)		/əl/	/el/	paddle surf	—		—
oha		/uə/	/oa/	cohabitar	—		—
ohà		/uˈa/	/oˈa/	bohàiric	—		—
ohe		/uə/	/oe/	cohesió	—		—
ohè		/uɛ/	/oɛ/	bohèmia	—		—
ohi		/ui/	/oi/	prohibir	—		—
ohí		/uˈi/	/oˈi/	microhílids	—		—
oho		/uˈɔ/	/oˈɔ/	cohort	—		—
oho		/uː/	/oː/	cohobació	—		—
ohò		/uˈɔ/	/oˈɔ/	alcohòlic	—		—
ohu		/uː/	/ou/	argiŀlohumífer	—		—
ow (in loanwords)		/ou̯/		flow	—		—
ow (in loanwords)		/au̯/		cowboy	—		—
oy (old form and loanwords)		/ɔi̯/		Roy	/u̯a/		Troyes
qu	before a, o	/kw/		quan	—		—
qu	before e, i	/k/		quina	—		—
qü	before e, i	/kw/		qüestió	—		—

== Bibliography ==
- Gramàtica normativa valenciana. Acadèmia Valenciana de la Llengua (AVL).
- Guia d'usos lingüístics. Institut Interuniversitari de Filologia Valenciana. 2002.
- Ortografia catalana. Institut d'Estudis Catalans (IEC).
- Diccionari normatiu valencià. Acadèmia Valenciana de la Llengua (AVL).
- Diccionari català-valencià-balear. Editorial Moll.
- "Ús d'estrangerismes. Llibre d'estil". Universitat Pompeu Fabra (UPF).
- "ésAdir". Corporació Catalana de Mitjans Audiovisuals. Generalitat de Catalunya.
